WJBX may refer to:
 WCUM, a radio station (1450 AM) in Bridgeport, Connecticut, United States, which held the WJBX call sign from 1985 to 1989
 WWCN, a radio station (99.3 FM) in Fort Myers Beach, Florida, United States, which held the WJBX call sign from 1992 to 2013
 WBCN (AM), a radio station (770 AM) in North Fort Myers, Florida, which held the WJBX call sign from 2013 to 2021
 WBCN (North Carolina), a defunct radio station (1660 AM) in Charlotte, North Carolina, United States, which was assigned the WJBX call sign in 2021 and 2022